Riitta Särösalo (born ) is a Finnish wheelchair curler.

She participated in the 2018 Winter Paralympics where Finnish team finished on eleventh place.

Teams

References

External links 

 Video: 

Living people
1952 births
Finnish female curlers
Finnish wheelchair curlers
Paralympic wheelchair curlers of Finland
Wheelchair curlers at the 2018 Winter Paralympics
Finnish wheelchair curling champions
Place of birth missing (living people)